The arrondissement of Tournon-sur-Rhône is an arrondissement of France in the Ardèche department in the Auvergne-Rhône-Alpes region. It has 118 communes.

Composition

The communes of the arrondissement of Tournon-sur-Rhône, and their INSEE codes, are:

 Accons (07001)
 Albon-d'Ardèche
 Alboussière (07007)
 Andance (07009)
 Annonay (07010)
 Arcens (07012)
 Ardoix (07013)
 Arlebosc (07014)
 Arras-sur-Rhône (07015)
 Belsentes (07165)
 Boffres (07035)
 Bogy (07036)
 Boucieu-le-Roi (07040)
 Boulieu-lès-Annonay (07041)
 Bozas (07039)
 Brossainc (07044)
 Le Chambon (07049)
 Champagne (07051)
 Champis (07052)
 Chanéac (07054)
 Charmes-sur-Rhône
 Charnas (07056)
 Châteaubourg (07059)
 Cheminas (07063)
 Le Cheylard (07064)
 Colombier-le-Cardinal (07067)
 Colombier-le-Jeune (07068)
 Colombier-le-Vieux (07069)
 Cornas (07070)
 Le Crestet (07073)
 Davézieux (07078)
 Désaignes (07079)
 Devesset (07080)
 Dornas (07082)
 Eclassan (07084)
 Empurany (07085)
 Étables (07086)
 Félines (07089)
 Gilhoc-sur-Ormèze (07095)
 Glun (07097)
 Guilherand-Granges (07102)
 Issamoulenc
 Jaunac (07108)
 Labatie-d'Andaure (07114)
 Lachapelle-sous-Chanéac (07123)
 Lafarre (07124)
 Lalouvesc (07128)
 Lamastre (07129)
 Lemps (07140)
 Limony (07143)
 Mariac (07150)
 Mars (07151)
 Mauves (07152)
 Monestier (07160)
 Nozières (07166)
 Ozon (07169)
 Pailharès (07170)
 Peaugres (07172)
 Peyraud (07174)
 Plats (07177)
 Préaux (07185)
 Quintenas (07188)
 Rochepaule (07192)
 Roiffieux (07197)
 Saint-Agrève (07204)
 Saint-Alban-d'Ay (07205)
 Saint-Andéol-de-Fourchades (07209)
 Saint-André-en-Vivarais (07212)
 Saint-Barthélemy-Grozon (07216)
 Saint-Barthélemy-le-Meil (07215)
 Saint-Barthélemy-le-Plain (07217)
 Saint-Basile (07218)
 Saint-Christol (07220)
 Saint-Cierge-sous-le-Cheylard (07222)
 Saint-Clair (07225)
 Saint-Clément (07226)
 Saint-Cyr (07227)
 Saint-Désirat (07228)
 Saint-Étienne-de-Valoux (07234)
 Saint-Félicien (07236)
 Saint-Genest-Lachamp (07239)
 Saint-Georges-les-Bains
 Saint-Jacques-d'Atticieux (07243)
 Saint-Jean-de-Muzols (07245)
 Saint-Jean-Roure (07248)
 Saint-Jeure-d'Andaure (07249)
 Saint-Jeure-d'Ay (07250)
 Saint-Julien-d'Intres (07103)
 Saint-Julien-Vocance (07258)
 Saint-Marcel-lès-Annonay (07265)
 Saint-Martin-de-Valamas (07269)
 Saint-Michel-d'Aurance (07276)
 Saint-Péray (07281)
 Saint-Pierre-sur-Doux (07285)
 Saint-Pierreville
 Saint-Prix (07290)
 Saint-Romain-d'Ay (07292)
 Saint-Romain-de-Lerps (07293)
 Saint-Sylvestre (07297)
 Saint-Symphorien-de-Mahun (07299)
 Saint-Victor (07301)
 Sarras (07308)
 Satillieu (07309)
 Savas (07310)
 Sécheras (07312)
 Serrières (07313)
 Soyons (07316)
 Talencieux (07317)
 Thorrenc (07321)
 Toulaud (07323)
 Tournon-sur-Rhône (07324)
 Vanosc (07333)
 Vaudevant (07335)
 Vernosc-lès-Annonay (07337)
 Villevocance (07342)
 Vinzieux (07344)
 Vion (07345)
 Vocance (07347)

History

The arrondissement of Tournon-sur-Rhône was created in 1800. At the January 2017 reorganization of the arrondissements of Ardèche, it gained five communes from the arrondissement of Privas and it lost three communes to the arrondissement of Largentière and eight communes to the arrondissement of Privas.

As a result of the reorganisation of the cantons of France which came into effect in 2015, the borders of the cantons are no longer related to the borders of the arrondissements. The cantons of the arrondissement of Tournon-sur-Rhône were, as of January 2015:

 Annonay-Nord
 Annonay-Sud
 Le Cheylard
 Lamastre
 Saint-Agrève
 Saint-Félicien
 Saint-Martin-de-Valamas
 Saint-Péray
 Satillieu
 Serrières
 Tournon-sur-Rhône
 Vernoux-en-Vivarais

References

Tournon-sur-Rhone